Tomáš Randa (born 23 December 1974) is a Czech former football player.

Randa played for several Gambrinus liga clubs during his career, including SK Sigma Olomouc and FK Drnovice.

External links
 
 Profile at 1. FC Slovácko website
 Sportunion TRANSFER St. Veit website

Czech footballers
1974 births
Living people
Czech First League players
FK Drnovice players
1. FK Příbram players
SK Sigma Olomouc players
1. FC Slovácko players
Association football defenders